Access Point is a rocky point immediately southeast of Biscoe Point and  northwest of Cape Lancaster on the south side of Anvers Island, in the Palmer Archipelago. First charted by the French Antarctic Expedition under Jean-Baptiste Charcot, 1903–05. Surveyed in 1955 by the Falkland Islands Dependencies Survey (FIDS) and so named because there is a landing place for boats on the northwest tip of the point which provides access to the inland parts of the island.

Headlands of the Palmer Archipelago
Geography of Anvers Island